The League for Industrial Democracy (LID) was founded as a successor to the Intercollegiate Socialist Society in 1921. Members decided to change its name to reflect a more inclusive and more organizational perspective.

Background

Intercollegiate Socialist Society

The I.S.S. was founded in 1905 by Upton Sinclair, Walter Lippmann, Clarence Darrow, and Jack London with the stated purpose of throwing "light on the world-wide movement of industrial democracy known as socialism."

Name change
In the spring of 1921, the ISS held a vote regarding the name and goals of their organization. Harry Laidler announced: "the members of the Intercollegiate Socialist Society had declared themselves in favor of the change in name and purpose." In November, the organization assumed its new name and enlarged its scope to addressing society at large. They also presented their new guiding principle: "Education for a New Social Order Based on Production for Public Use and Not for Private Profit."

Early years
In its early years, the LID addressed societal problems such as poverty, child labor, work conditions, and poor housing conditions, under the leadership of notable activists: Robert Morss Lovett, Charles P. Steinmetz, Florence Kelley, and Stuart Chase. It became the base for leftwing intellectuals, otherwise known as Muckrakers. During the Great Depression of the 1930s, the LID organized radio stations and broadcasts centered around the New Deal. Throughout its history, the LID has called itself a proponent of the labor movement. The group saw this movement as a progressive force that is misunderstood by intellectuals. The goal of this is to break down these perceived boundaries and to promote "education for increasing democracy in our economic, political, and cultural life"

Today's affiliates are mostly anti-communists and focus their energy on democracy building in places such as Eastern Europe, Africa, and Central America, while paying very little attention to its domestic program.

Student affiliates 

Its campus presence waned until the Great Depression of the 1930s led to an increase in radical student activism. The collegiate section was reorganized into an autonomous Student League for Industrial Democracy (SLID) in 1933. This merged with the Communist National Student League in 1935 to create the popular front American Student Union. LID activity on campus remained somewhat dormant until 1946, when the Student League for Industrial Democracy was reconstituted.

Students for a Democratic Society
On January 1, 1960, the SLID changed its name to the Students for a Democratic Society and began to take a more radical direction. In July 1962 Michael Harrington, then chair, and Tom Kahn clashed with Tom Hayden and Alan Haber over their Port Huron Statement, in particular its
 suggestion that the labor movement was "too quiescent, to be counted with enthusiasm" as an agent for change, 
 espousal of participatory democracy and dislike of formal offices, seen as potentially undemocratic and lacking accountability, and
 failure to explicitly exclude communists from its vision of the New Left.

By 1965, SDS had separated from the LID, but it ended national activity in 1969, after it had been taken over by Maoist groups, some of which advocated and committed political terrorism.

Activities
The LID has been actively supporting the Solidarity movement in Poland since 1980, providing financial, moral and political support. Furthermore, in 1986, the LID coordinated efforts on a campaign to protest the crackdown on Polish universities by the government. The LID, in conjunction with Poland Watch Center and Committee in Support of Solidarity, publishes a quarterly bulletin Solidarnosc. The Brussels-based Committee in Support of Solidarity (CSS) is a group heavily supported by the National Endowment for Democracy (NED), a U.S. government-funded organization that sponsors anticommunist,"democracy-building" projects around the globe. In a three-year period, CSS received over a million dollars from NED.

The League is a membership organization. Fees range from $5 to $25 per year, while lifetime memberships are $500.

References

Sources
 Bernard K. Johnpoll and Mark R. Yerburgh (eds.), The League for Industrial Democracy: A Documentary History. In three volumes. Westport, CT: Greenwood Press, 1980.
 Kirkpatrick Sale, SDS. New York: Random House, 1973.

External links
 League for Industrial Democracy
 Intercollegiate Socialist Society (1905 - 1921). Online documents at Early American Marxism site. Retrieved August 23, 2006.
Thirty-five years of educational pioneering; L.I.D. celebrates past achievements and asks "Where do we go from here?"
Forty years of education, the task ahead
The L.I.D.: fifty years of democratic education, 1905-1955.
The challenge of change and conflict in American society The proceedings of the 70th annual conference of the League for Industrial Democracy held in New York City on May 2 and 3, 1975.
Guide to League for Industrial Democracy. Pamphlets, 1922-1978. 5266. Kheel Center for Labor-Management Documentation and Archives, Martin P. Catherwood Library, Cornell University.
 League for Industrial Democracy Records at Tamiment Library and Robert F. Wagner Archives

Student wings of political parties in the United States
Socialist Party of America
1905 establishments in the United States
Political advocacy groups in the United States